Life Gone Wild is the first EP by British rock band Asking Alexandria. It was released on 21 December 2010, through Sumerian Records and contains "Breathless", dubstep remixes of "A Single Moment of Sincerity" and "Not the American Average", two Skid Row covers of "18 and Life" and "Youth Gone Wild", and an unreleased demo version of "I Was Once, Possibly, Maybe, Perhaps a Cowboy King". The cover art is similar to the cover of Skid Row's self-titled debut album from 1989. The title comes from two Skid Row song titles combined, "18 and Life" and "Youth Gone Wild".

Background
In an Alternative Press interview, Ben Bruce showed concern for the EP's reception, questioning if people would like it. He said it had influences from 1980s "classic rock", specifically the Skid Row cover songs. He said the "Sincerity" and "American Average" remixes were done to "broad the horizons and introduce people to another genre of music we love to listen to." The demo of "I Was Once, Possibly, Maybe, Perhaps a Cowboy King" is a "version that most people won't be familiar with and that you can't buy anywhere else." In a Blue Devil Hub review, Tim Karan wrote that the songs on the EP were a mix of genres, none of which seemed to fit the band.

Track listing

Personnel
Asking Alexandria
 Danny Worsnop – lead vocals, keyboards, programming
 Ben Bruce – lead guitar, backing vocals, keyboards, programming
 Cameron Liddell – rhythm guitar
 Sam Bettley – bass
 James Cassells – drums

Additional personnel
 Joey Sturgis – production on "Breathless" demo version

References

2010 EPs
Asking Alexandria albums
Sumerian Records albums